David Winston Howard Shale (22 March 1932, New Zealand – 7 January 2016) was a New Zealand-American mathematician, specializing in the mathematical foundations of quantum physics. He is known as one of the namesakes of the Segal–Shale-Weil representation.

After secondary and undergraduate education in New Zealand, Shale became a graduate student in mathematics at the University of Chicago and received his Ph.D. there in 1960. His thesis On certain groups of operators on Hilbert space was written under the supervision of Irving Segal. Shale became an assistant professor at the University of California, Berkeley and then became in 1964 a professor at the University of Pennsylvania, where he continued teaching until his retirement.

According to Irving Segal:

Selected publications

References

1932 births
2016 deaths
New Zealand mathematicians
20th-century American mathematicians
21st-century American mathematicians
University of Chicago alumni
University of Pennsylvania faculty
Operator theorists
Probability theorists